Zahari Stoyanovo may refer to the following places in Bulgaria:

Zahari Stoyanovo, Dobrich Province
Zahari Stoyanovo, Targovishte Province